Leon Abner Quillen (born Leon Abner Quillin, May 5, 1882 – May 14, 1965) was a professional baseball third baseman.

Quillen started his professional baseball career in 1902 with the minor league Minneapolis Millers of the newly formed American Association. In 1906, he had a breakout year with the Lincoln Ducklings in the Western League, hitting for a .350 average. He was sent to the major league White Sox towards the end of the season and played four games for the eventual World Series champions. The following year, he hit just .192 as Chicago's backup third baseman.

Quillen returned to the Millers in 1908 and 1909. In 1910, he scored 133 runs for the Western League champion Sioux City Packers. After four more years in the minors, Quillen finished his career in 1914 with the Lincoln team, now renamed the Tigers.

References

External links

Major League Baseball third basemen
Chicago White Sox players
Minneapolis Millers (baseball) players
Duluth Cardinals players
Duluth White Sox players
St. Joseph Saints players
Lincoln Ducklings players
Sioux City Packers players
Denver Grizzlies (baseball) players
Denver Bears players
Lincoln Tigers players
Baseball players from Minnesota
1882 births
1965 deaths
People from North Branch, Minnesota